A fell (from Old Norse fell, fjall, "mountain") is a high and barren landscape feature, such as a mountain or moor-covered hill. The term is most often employed in Fennoscandia, Iceland, the Isle of Man, parts of northern England, and Scotland.

Etymology 
The English word "fell" comes from Old Norse fell and fjall (both forms existed). It is cognate with Danish fjeld, Faroese fjall and fjøll, Icelandic fjall and fell, Norwegian fjell with dialects fjøll, fjødd, fjedd, fjedl, fjill, fil(l), and fel, and Swedish fjäll, all referring to mountains rising above the alpine tree line.

British Isles 

In northern England, especially in the Lake District and in the Pennine Dales, the word "fell" originally referred to an area of uncultivated high ground used as common grazing usually on common land and above the timberline. Today, generally, "fell" refers to the mountains and hills of the Lake District and the Pennine Dales.

Names that originally referred to grazing areas have been applied to these hilltops. This is the case with Seathwaite Fell, for example, which would be the common grazing land used by the farmers of Seathwaite. The fellgate marks the road from a settlement onto the fell (see photograph for example), as is the case with the Seathwaite Fell. In other cases the reverse is true; for instance, the name of Wetherlam, in the Coniston Fells, though understood to refer to the mountain as a whole, strictly speaking refers to the summit; the slopes have names such as Tilberthwaite High Fell, Low Fell and Above Beck Fells.

The word "fell" is also used in the names of various breeds of livestock, bred for life on the uplands, such as Rough Fell sheep, Fell terriers and Fell ponies.

It is also found in many place names across the north of England, often attached to the name of a community; thus the township of Cartmel Fell.

In northern England, there is a Lord of the Fells – this ancient aristocratic title being associated with the Lords of Bowland.

Groups of cairns are a common feature on many fells, often marking the summit – there are fine examples on Wild Boar Fell in Mallerstang Dale, Cumbria, and on Nine Standards Rigg just outside Kirkby Stephen, Cumbria.

As the most mountainous region of England, the Lake District is the area most closely associated with the sport of fell running, which takes its name from the fells of the district. "Fellwalking" is also the term used locally for the activity known in the rest of Great Britain as hillwalking.

The word "fell" also enjoys limited use in Scotland; with, for example, the Campsie Fells in central Scotland, to the north-east of Glasgow. One of the most famous examples of the use of the word "fell" in Scotland is Goat Fell, the highest point on the Isle of Arran. Criffel and the nearby Long Fell in Galloway may be seen from the northern Lake District of England.

Fennoscandia

Norway
In Norway, fjell, in common usage, is generally interpreted as simply a summit or area of greater altitude than a hill, which leads to a great deal of local variation in what is defined as a fjell. Fjell is mostly used about areas above the forest line. Distinct summits can be referred to as et fjell (a mountain). High plateaus (vidde landscape) such as Hardangervidda are also regarded as fjell. Professor of geography at the University of Bergen, Anders Lundeberg, has summed up the problem by stating,  "There simply is no fixed and unambiguous definition of fjell." Ivar Aasen defined fjell as a "tall berg", primarily referring to a berg that reaches an altitude where trees don't grow, lower berg are referred to as "berg", ås (hill, ridge) or hei (moor, heathland). The fixed expression til fjells refers to mountains (or uplands) as a collective rather than a specific location or specific summit (the "s" in til fjells is an old genitive form remaining only in fixed expressions). According to Ivar Aasen, berg refers to cliffs, bedrock and notable elevations of the surface underpinned by bedrock; berg also refers to the substance of bedrock. For all practical purposes, fjell can be translated as "mountain" and the Norwegian language has no other commonly used word for mountain.

Sweden
In Sweden, fjäll generally refers to any mountain or upland high enough that forest will not naturally survive at the top, in effect a mountain tundra. Fjäll is primarily used to describe mountains in the Nordic countries, but also more generally to describe mountains shaped by massive ice sheets, primarily in Arctic and subarctic regions. There are however dialectal differences in usage, with comparatively low mountains or plateaus, sometimes tree-covered, in Bohuslän and Västergötland (e.g.  and ) being referred to as "fjäll", similar to how the word is used in Norwegian

Finland

In Finnish, the mountains characteristic of the region of Lapland are called tunturi (plural: tunturit), i.e. "fell". A tunturi is a hill high enough that its top is above the tree line and has alpine tundra. In Finnish, the geographical term vuori is used for mountains recently uplifted and with jagged terrain featuring permanent glaciers, while tunturi refers to the old, highly eroded, gently shaped terrain without glaciers, as found in Finland. They are round inselbergs rising from the otherwise flat surroundings. The tree line can be at a rather low altitude, such as 600 m in Enontekiö, owing to the high latitude. The fells in Finnish Lapland form vestiges of the Karelides mountains, formed two billion years ago. The term tunturi is also generally used to refer to treeless plains at high altitudes in far north regions. The term tunturi, originally a word limited to far-Northern dialects of Finnish and Karelian, is a loan from Sami, compare Proto-Sami *tuontër, South Sami doedtere, Northern Sami duottar, Inari Sami tuodâr "uplands, mountains, tundra", Kildin Sami tūndâr, which means "uplands, treeless mountain tract" and is cognate with Finnish tanner "hard ground". From this Sami word, the word "tundra" is borrowed, as well, through the Russian language. Hills that are over 50 m high, but do not reach the tree line are referred to as vaara, while the general term for hills including hills of 50 m or less is mäki. In place names, however, tunturi, vaara and vuori are used inconsistently, e.g. Rukatunturi is technically a vaara, as it lacks alpine tundra.

Förfjäll

The term förfjäll (literally "fore-fell") is used in Sweden and Finland to denote mountainous zones lower and less dissected than the fell proper. However, its more pronounced relief, its often higher amount of plateaux, and its coherent valley systems distinguishes the förfjäll also from the undulating hilly terrain (bergkullsterräng) and the plains with residual hills (bergkullslätt). Generally, the förfjäll do not surpass 1000 m ASL. As a geomorphic unit, the förfjäll extends across Sweden as a 650 km-long and 40 km to 80 km-broad belt from Dalarna in the south to Norrbotten in the north.

Scandinavian and English terms 

 bekkr - 'stream' » beck
 dalr - 'valley' » dale
 fors - 'waterfall' » force/foss
 fjallr - 'mountain' (usually a large, flat mountain) » fell
 gil - 'ravine' » gill/ghyll
 haugr - 'hill' » howe
 pic - 'peak' » pike
 sætr - 'shieling' » side/seat
 tjorn - 'small lake' » tarn
 þveit - 'clearing' » thwaite
 ness - 'headland' » ness

See also

 Fell farming
 Fell Terrier
 List of fells in the Lake District
 List of Wainwrights (the 214 fells described in A. Wainwright's Pictorial Guide to the Lakeland Fells)
 The Outlying Fells of Lakeland
 List of Birketts (the 541 fells in Bill Birketts Complete Lakeland Fells)
 Middlesex Fells, a rocky highland just north of Boston, Massachusetts
 Snaefell, Isle of Man
 Nunatak

Notes

References

 Wainwright, A. (2003). "Coniston Old Man" in A Pictorial Guide to the Lakeland Fells, Book Four: The Southern Fells, p. 15. London: Francis Lincoln. 
 Bjordvand, Harald; Lindeman, Fredrik Otto (2007). Våre arveord. Novus. 
 Falk, Hjalmar; Torp, Alf (2006). Etymologisk ordbog over det norske og det danske sprog. Bjørn Ringstrøms Antikvariat. 

Landforms
Mountains